Elisas univers was a dating show that aired on TV3 hosted by Elisa Røtterud, a former contestant on the Norwegian Survivor.

The show premiered on 17 January 2000.

External links
 Elisas lekegrind (Norwegian)
 Elisa på sjekker'n (Norwegian)
 Lurte Elisa trill rundt (Norwegian)
 

TV3 (Norway) original programming
Norwegian game shows
2000 Norwegian television series debuts
2000 Norwegian television series endings
2000s Norwegian television series